Tabatinga International Airport  is the airport serving Tabatinga, Brazil.

It is operated by Vinci SA.

History
Previously operated by Infraero, on April 7, 2021 Vinci SA won a 30-year concession to operate the airport.

Airlines and destinations

Access

Accidents and incidents
12 June 1982: a TABA Fairchild Hiller FH-227 registration PT-LBV en route from Eirunepé to Tabatinga while on approach to Tabatinga collided with a pole in poor visibility and crashed onto a parking lot. All 40 passengers and 4 crew died.
29 October 2009: a Brazilian Air Force Cessna 208 Caravan registration FAB-2725 en route from Cruzeiro do Sul do Tabatinga made an emergency landing on a river due engine failure. Of the 11 occupants, 1 passenger and 1 crew member died.

See also

List of airports in Brazil

References

External links

Airports in Amazonas (Brazilian state)